Patricio Abella Buzon (born 14 March 1950) is a prelate of the Roman Catholic Church in the Philippines. He is the current Bishop of Bacolod in Negros Occidental. His previous appointment was as the Bishop of Kabankalan.

Early life
Buzon was born in Cebu City, Cebu on 14 March 1950. He attended Don Bosco Academy in San Fernando, Pampanga for his secondary school education, and the Don Bosco College Seminary in Canlubang, Pampanga, where he earned a college degree in Industrial Education, majoring in Electricity. He completed his Bachelor of Sacred Theology degree from the University of Santo Tomas.

Ministry
He served as spiritual moderator of the Don Bosco Missionary Seminary in Talisay, Cebu from 1977 until 1982. In 2003, he was ordained as Bishop of the Diocese of Kabankalan. He was appointed as Bishop of the Diocese of Bacolod on 24 May 2016.

References

20th-century Roman Catholic bishops in the Philippines
University of Santo Tomas alumni
People from Cebu City
1950 births
Living people